Spectral Dusk is a studio album by Canadian indie folk-rock band Evening Hymns, released in 2013. The album was longlisted for the 2013 Polaris Music Prize.

Track listing

 Intro (2:07)
 Arrows (5:35)
 Family Tree (4:27)
 You and Jake (5:54)
 Cabin in the Burn (6:35)
 Asleep in the Pews (5:30)
 Spirit in the Sky (3:21)
 Irving Lake Access Road, February 12, 2011 (9:16)
 Song to Sleep To (2:16)
 Moon River (4:35)
 Spectral Dusk (7:21)

All songs written by Jonas Bonetta
Recorded and mixed by James Bunton 
Produced by James Bunton and Jonas Bonnetta 
Mastered by Fedge

References

2013 albums
Evening Hymns albums